KEZX (730 AM) is a radio station broadcasting a sports format. Licensed to Medford, Oregon, United States, the station serves the Medford-Ashland area.  The station is currently owned by Opus Broadcasting Systems.

It was announced by All Access Radio Group on Friday, January 18, 2008, that KEZX was going to switch to "All Sports" on February 4, 2009. The station was then to be known as "Fox Sports Radio 730 AM," using programming from Fox Sports Radio, Premiere Radio Networks and The Jim Rome Show as it does presently.

References

External links
FCC History Cards for KEZX

EZX
Sports radio stations in the United States
Medford, Oregon
Radio stations established in 1954
1954 establishments in Oregon